Ornithopus perpusillus or little white bird's-foot, is a plant species of the genus Ornithopus.

References

Loteae
Plants described in 1753
Taxa named by Carl Linnaeus